Top Country Albums is a chart that ranks the top-performing country music albums in the United States, published by Billboard.  In 2007, 21 different albums topped the chart, based on electronic point of sale data provided by SoundScan Inc.

In the issue of Billboard dated January 6, Carrie Underwood was at number one with Some Hearts, the album's 19th week in the top spot.  Having first reached number one in late 2005, the album returned to the top spot several times over the next 18 months.  It was the biggest-selling country music of both 2006 and 2007. Underwood returned to the top spot in November with her next album Carnival Ride, making her one of two acts to achieve two number ones during the year; the other was the trio Rascal Flatts, who spent two weeks at number one with Me and My Gang in January and then returned to the peak position in October with Still Feels Good, which spent four weeks atop the chart.  Me and My Gang, Still Feels Good and Carnival Ride all topped the all-genre Billboard 200 chart, as did albums by Tim McGraw, Toby Keith, Reba McEntire and the Eagles.

Four acts reached number one for the first time in 2007, most notably teenage vocalist Taylor Swift, whose self-titled debut album had the year's longest unbroken run at number one, spending eight consecutive weeks in the top spot.  Swift would quickly become a major star in the country field before moving into the pop music market, where she would become one of the most successful artists in the world.  The three other first-time country chart-toppers of 2007 each spent a single week in the top spot: Jason Michael Carroll with Waitin' in the Country in February, former American Idol finalist Bucky Covington with his self-titled album in May, and Jason Aldean with Relentless in June.  The year's final chart-topper was Long Road Out of Eden by the Eagles, which entered the chart at number one in the issue of Billboard dated November 17.  It spent two weeks in the top spot, was displaced for two weeks by Garth Brooks's compilation album The Ultimate Hits, then returned to number one and remained there for the remainder of the year.  It was the band's first studio album since 1979's The Long Run; having been inactive since 1980, the band had reformed in 1994 but did not release any new material until 2007.

Chart history

References

2007
United States Country Albums